The Neo-Futurists are an experimental theater troupe founded by Greg Allen in 1988, based on an aesthetics of honesty, speed and brevity. Neo-Futurists in theatre were inspired by the Italian Futurist movement from the early 20th century. Originating in Chicago, branches of the Neo-Futurists also exist in New York City, San Francisco, and London (the latter under the name Degenerate Fox).

Aesthetic

The Neo-Futurist aesthetic demands that everything that transpires in their theater be non-illusory, which is to say that they pretend nothing;  actors only play themselves.  All plays take place on a stage, specifically, the stage on which they are performed, in the present.  If one of the performers reports that something has happened, you can bet that it really happened.  Much of their work contains the possibility of failure, a unique theatrical component that keeps them and the audience honest.  Their plays are wildly eclectic, touching on all genres and tones; plays may be political, satirical, personal, tragic, comic, abstract, musical, surreal, poetic, and so on.

The bottom line is that Neo-Futurism does not buy into the "suspension of disbelief"—it does not attempt to take the audience anywhere else at any other time with any other people. The idea is to deal with what is going on right here and now.

History
The Neo-Futurists began with the show Too Much Light Makes the Baby Go Blind: 30 Plays in 60 Minutes, often abbreviated as TMLMTBGB (though many refer to it simply as TML). For the first few years, the Neo-Futurist movement consisted entirely of TMLMTBGB, but then expanded to include "prime time productions." These productions began late evening, as opposed to TMLMTBGB late-night starting time (11:30 in Chicago, 10:30 in New York).

The Neo-Futurists have published three books of plays from TMLMTBGB - two books of regular plays, and one of plays that use only one actor. They've also released one CD recording of plays from Too Much Light Makes the Baby Go Blind, one video, and a recording of Jokes and their Relation to the Unconscious, a play described as an attempt to destroy comedy by analyzing it to death.

In 2008 the New York Neo-Futurists put on (Not) Just a Day Like Any Other, four autobiographical stories woven together with accompanying Bollywood music videos, relationships charted via PowerPoint, and margaritas for all.

In November 2016, Greg Allen announced in an emailed press release that he intended to revoke the Chicago company's rights to perform TMLMTBGB. Allen had ceased to be a member of the performing ensemble four years prior, and in his announcement he stated his intention to form a new company to perform the show as a way to "combat the new Trump administration." In a response statement, the Neo-Futurists stated that they were "disappointed that it has come to this conclusion," but that "throughout our long history with Greg there have been considerable artistic differences and irreconcilable personal conflicts." Additionally, a former artistic director and ensemble member disputed Allen's claim that the split was motivated by external politics, citing instead ongoing personality conflicts. In solidarity with the Chicago company, the New York and San Francisco productions of Too Much Light also closed that December.

Subsequently, the Neo-Futurists developed and opened a new weekly late-night show in 2017 titled The Infinite Wrench in all three branches to continue to showcase their two-minute plays. The Chicago ensemble notably reached their 10,000th play on September 29th, 2017. A fourth branch, operating in London as Degenerate Fox, runs the similar show The Dirty Thirty.

Theater members

Since 1988, the ranks of the Neo-Futurists have included the following individuals (listed alphabetically):

Stephen Colbert (now famous for his television persona in The Colbert Report) auditioned for the Neo-Futurists, and was cast as part of the ensemble, but never got an opportunity to perform with them.

Theater locations
 Chicago: 5153 N. Ashland Avenue (The Neo-Futurarium)
 New York: 85 E. 4th St., near 2nd Ave. (The Kraine)
 San Francisco: 144 Taylor Street (PianoFight)
 London: 2 Shepperton Road (Rosemary Branch Theatre)

Accolades
In 2011, the New York Neo-Futurists produced an original piece, "Locker 4173b," wherein Neo-Futurists Joey Rizzolo and Christopher Borg purchased a foreclosed storage locker and, as amateur archaeologists, excavated, catalogued, and chronicled their findings. The show received critical acclaim and received a New York Innovative Theater Award for Outstanding Performance Art Production in 2011.

The New York Neo-Futurists were also New York Innovative Theatre Awards recipients for 'Outstanding Performance Art Production' in 2006, 2011, & 2017, 'Outstanding Ensemble' in 2009, and the Caffe Cino Award 2010. They also have been nominated for two Drama Desk awards in 2012 and 2014. In 2009 the New York company won the Village Voice Readers’ Choice poll for Best Performance Art and was named one of the nytheatre.com People of the Year.

References

External links
 The Chicago Neo-Futurists - Chicago Neo-Futurists Official homepage.
 The NY Neo-Futurists — New York Neo-Futurists Official homepage.
 The San Francisco Neo-Futurists — San Francisco Neo-Futurists Official homepage.
 Degenerate Fox — Degenerate Fox Theatre (London Neo-futurists) Official website.
 Dean Evans — Dean Evans' Website.
 Performers at Cusp Conference 2009

Futurist theatre
Theatre companies in Chicago
Theatre companies in San Francisco
Arts organizations established in 1988
Theatre Ensemble in New York City